New Zealand laurel is a common name for several plants and may refer to:

 Corynocarpus laevigatus, an evergreen tree with large glossy leaves endemic to New Zealand
 Coprosma repens, a popular shrub which is resistant to salt spray